Henry James Clutterbuck (June 1873 – 19 February 1948) was an English professional footballer who played as a goalkeeper. He made 89 appearances in the Football League playing for Small Heath, Grimsby Town and Chesterfield. He also played for Queens Park Rangers, New Brompton and Fulham in the Southern League. Clutterbuck was born in Wheatenhurst, Gloucestershire, and died in Gloucester.

References

1873 births
1948 deaths
People from Whitminster
English footballers
Association football goalkeepers
Hereford Thistle F.C. players
Birmingham City F.C. players
Queens Park Rangers F.C. players
Grimsby Town F.C. players
Chesterfield F.C. players
Gillingham F.C. players
Fulham F.C. players
English Football League players
Southern Football League players
Sportspeople from Gloucestershire